The Georgian route S2 (Georgian: საერთაშორისო მნიშვნელობის გზა ს2, Saertashoriso mnishvnelobis gza S2, road of international importance), also known as Senaki-Poti-Sarpi (Turkish border), is a "road of international importance" within the Georgian road network which runs from Senaki via Poti, Kobuleti, and Batumi to the border with Turkey near Sarpi (Adjara) with a length of . After crossing the Georgian-Turkish border the highway continues as D.010 ("Black Sea Coastal Road") to Trabzon. The S2 highway is part of European E60, E70, E97 and Asian AH5 routes and is mostly built as a 2-lane road through villages, towns and cities. Part of the highway has been upgraded in recent years to a single carriageway with hard shoulder bypassing residential communities.

Background
Since a 1960 Soviet decree the Kobuleti-Batumi section of the current S2 was part of Soviet main road 19, one of only 37 listed routes in the Soviet Union, which ran between Novorossiysk and Batumi via Samtredia and Ozurgeti. The Samtredia-Ozurgeti-Kobuleti part of this route 19 followed the current Sh2 route. In 1982 the Soviet road numbering system was overhauled and the foundation of the current S2 was laid: the A-305 number was designated to Mikha Tskhakaya (Senaki) - Batumi via Poti.

After Georgia regained independence in 1991, the A-305 designation was maintained until 1996 when the current route numbering system was adopted. In that year the "roads of international importance" (S-)category was introduced and the "ს2 Senaki-Poti-Sarpi (Turkish border)" replaced the A-305 number. Compared to the A-305 the S2 route was extended from the north side of Batumi through the city to the Turkish border at Sarpi.

The S2 highway is built as a simple two lane road, but parts have been and will be upgraded to higher standards within the scope of the 2005 initiated East-West Highway project. In a separate project, the dual tube four lane 650 m Chakvi-Makhinjauri tunnel which bypasses a curvy section of the highway was the first major upgrade to the S2 highway. It was completed in September 2005. The construction of the tunnel initially started in 2001, but came to a halt in April 2004 due to Adjara crisis in that period. The crisis resulted in the central government of Georgia regaining authority over the Autonomous Republic of Adjara, the location of the tunnel. In spring 2005 works resumed.

East-West Highway

The East-West Highway project includes redesign of major sections of the Georgian S1, S2, S4, S12 and more recently the S7 highway, to grade-separated highways, mostly as 2x2 expressway or motorway.

Despite earlier political promises the East-West Highway would be finished by 2020, the construction of crucial sections, including the S2 highway, is still ongoing (as of 2021) until at least 2024. The project is sponsored by European and Asian development banks, the World Bank, European Union and others, with credits amounting to more than $2 billion for the S1 upgrades alone (plus additional state funding), while the S2 upgrades amount to $800 million. Construction companies from various European and Asian countries have been involved, with mixed success. Some tenders ran into technical and legal issues, with some contracts having been terminated by the Georgian government due to excessive underperformance of the contracted party, resulting in multiple year delays on various lots.

For the S2 highway the (E60/E70) East-West Highway project is scoped to the  Grigoleti - Sarpi, Georgia section. As early as 2005 the Georgian government identified and studied the need for bypasses around Kobuleti and Batumi for a better traffic flow in connection with the S12 Samtredia — Grigoleti. This means that most of the new Grigoleti to Sarpi section has been redesigned inland, bypassing towns and villages. The project envisions to upgrade the S2 between Grigoleti and Shekvetili as extension of the S12 to (2x2) expressway/motorway standards and the Kobuleti and Batumi Bypasses as two-lane expressway.

Grigoleti — Shekvetili - The  between Grigoleti (S12) and Shekvetili (north end Kobuleti Bypass) has been under construction since 2019 as a 2x2 motorway, but completion has been delayed with an unknown period. The connection of the S2 with the S12 (under construction as 2x2 motorway) will be moved to the southside of the Supsa river mouth for a seamless flow of the S12 into the S2 in southern direction. In december 2022 the southern  near Shekvetili was opened as motorway. This part connects to the Kobuleti Bypass.

The old route of the S2 along the Black Sea coast between Shekvetili and Chakvi via Kobuleti town has been renumbered as Sh205.

Similarly to the Kobuleti Bypass, this will be a two-lane expressway featuring 19 bridges, 4 interchanges and 5 tunnels. With over a year delay, this is set to be finished by 2022 according to government sources.

Batumi — Sarpi - The  Batumi (Chorokhi) - Sarpi section was under study in 2018. No further plans have been developed, yet funding via the Asian Development Bank has been secured for $200 million. The steep cliffs along the Black Sea coast leaves little room for expansion of the road.

Below is an overview of S2 sections that have been or are being upgraded within the East-West Highway project, in consecutive order from North (Grigoleti) to South (Sarpi).

Other upgrades
A new bridge in the S2 across the Rioni River near Poti was announced, and construction tenders were published in 2021. The old bridge, a hydropower dam from 1959, is allegedly in bad shape even though the hydropower plant itself has been rehabilitated in 2018. The new bridge will be 500 meters long and will have a single carriageway plus hard shoulders. In November 2021 the Roads Department of the Ministry of Regional Development and Infrastructure announced construction will commence and that the Asian Development Bank finances the project expenses of $20 million.

No other upgrades of the S2 highway have been scheduled. The Senaki-Poti-Grigoleti section will remain an at-grade two lane highway for the foreseeable future (as of 2021).

Route
About  West of Senaki the S2 highway branches off the S1 highway and heads west to the Black Sea port of Poti, after which the route turns south along the Black Sea coast to the resort and port city of Batumi. The highway reaches its southern terminus in Sarpi at the Georgia–Turkey border. The entire highway is built as a two lane road.

Senaki — Poti
Between Senaki and Poti the road passes through a few villages and runs along the Senaki-Poti railway line through the Rioni river delta. Upon entering Poti it crosses the Rioni river via the Hydropower Dam. At the north side of the city the highway turns south at which corner the European E70 route has its eastern terminus. The highway circumvents the city centre, and after crossing the Rioni canal the European E60 route separates from the highway and turns to the port of Poti. The Poti seaport is a cross point of the Trans-Caucasian Corridor/TRACECA, a multinational project which connects the Romanian port of Constanţa and Bulgarian port Varna with the landlocked countries of the Caspian region and Central Asia. The E60 continues on the other side of the Black Sea, in Constanţa.

Poti — Kobuleti
The S2 highway leaves Poti city in southern direction via the narrow strip of land that separates Lake Paliastomi from the Black Sea. At Grigoleti the road junctions with the S12 highway which is the main route to Samtredia and Tbilisi. Passing the Supsa river, the two lane highway meets the hills of Guria but remains in the lowlands. After the upgrade of the S12 to 2x2 lane motorway the connection with the S2 will be moved to the south side of the Supsa river mouth. The S12 will flow seamlessly into the S2 in southern direction, and the S2 will become a 2x2 motorway until the Kobuleti Bypass at Shekvetili. The Kobuleti Bypass extends South for  until the northern area of Batumi near its famous Botanical Garden.

Kobuleti — Batumi — Sarpi
After passing Kobuleti resort the bypass enters the Adjara mountains and follows a curvy route with many bridges and a few tunnels. At Chakvi the highway passes through the dual tube 4-lane Chakvi-Makhinjauri tunnel which opened in 2005 and relieved traffic from a very curvy passage across the hills. At the south side of the Chakvi-Makhinjauri tunnel the Batumi Bypass will begin upon its expected completion as two-lane expressway by 2024. In the meantime the highway reaches the Black Sea coast and enters Batumi, Georgia's second largest city. After passing the port the road turns into the city centre. At the south side of the centre the road turns towards the airport which it circumvents to reach the Black Sea coast again south of the Chorokhi river. During the last kilometers to the Turkish border the mountains leave little room for the road and communities. The border checkpoints have little room as well, and the ever increasing truck traffic leads to long queues along the coast.

Intersections

References

Roads in Georgia (country)